Anya Waite is a biological oceanographer working at the Ocean Frontier Institute in Dalhousie University's Faculty of Science in Nova Scotia, Canada, where she was born and raised. She studies nitrogen fluxes in polar oceans and particle dynamics in mesoscale eddies as an Appointed Associate Vice-President Research (Ocean) of Dalhousie University and Chief Executive Officer of Ocean Frontier Institute. She was previously Winthrop Professor at the University of Western Australia's Oceans Institute, the Section Head of Polar Biological Oceanography at the Alfred Wegener Institute in Bremerhaven, and a professor of oceanography in the biology department at the University of Bremen. Throughout her time at the University of Western Australia, she was awarded the PCB Professional Development Scholarship. Anya attended the 27th annual Conference of the United Nations Framework Convention on climate change in November, 2022.

Education 
Waite earned a BSc in biology from Dalhousie and a PhD in biological oceanography from the University of British Columbia.

Selected publications

References 

Canadian oceanographers
Women oceanographers
Dalhousie University alumni
University of British Columbia alumni
Academic staff of the University of Bremen
Academic staff of the Dalhousie University
Academic staff of the University of Western Australia
Living people
Date of birth missing (living people)
Canadian expatriates in Germany
Canadian expatriates in Australia
Canadian women biologists
Year of birth missing (living people)